San Francesco d'Assisi is a Roman Catholic church building in the town of Gela, in the province of Caltanissetta, region of Sicily, Italy.

History
The Baroque church was built in 1659 to replace a prior church built in 1499. It houses prominent altarpieces including a Life of St Francis attributed to Giuseppe Salerno (Zoppo di Gangi); a Martyrdom of St Orsola by Francesco Paladini; and a Deposition (1768) by Vito D'Anna. The marble holy water font (16th-century) was likely sculpted by the studio of the Gagini family.

References

 

 
16th-century Roman Catholic church buildings in Italy